Mucosal melanoma is a rare condition characterized by a melanoma of the mucous membranes. This subtype is associated a worse prognosis than those arising from the skin. Mucosal melanomas occur in the head and neck (55%), anorectal (24%) and vulvovaginal region (18%), and in the urinary tract (3%). Based on the histopathologic and clinical features, melanomas of the vulva and vagina are often considered a separate disease entity. The prognosis of vulvovaginal melanomas is poor, especially for vaginal melanomas and has not improved over the last decades. While chemotherapy has not shown capacity to improve survival in clinical and observational studies, immune checkpoint inhibitors (e.g., pembrolizumab) have been tested in mucosal melanomas and have shown promising response rates.

See also 
 Melanoma

References

External links 

Melanoma
Rare cancers